Sossusvlei (sometimes written Sossus Vlei) is a salt and clay pan surrounded by high red dunes, located in the southern part of the Namib Desert, in the Namib-Naukluft National Park of Namibia. The name "Sossusvlei" is often used in an extended meaning to refer to the surrounding area (including other neighbouring vleis such as Deadvlei and other high dunes), which is one of the major visitor attractions of Namibia.

The name "Sossusvlei" is of mixed origin and roughly means "dead-end marsh". Vlei is the Afrikaans word for "marsh", while "sossus" is Nama for "no return" or "dead end". Sossusvlei owes this name to the fact that it is an endorheic drainage basin (i.e., a drainage basin without outflows) for the ephemeral Tsauchab River.

Environment

The Sossusvlei area belongs to a wider region of southern Namib with homogeneous features (about 32.000 km²) extending between rivers Koichab and Kuiseb. This area is characterized by high sand dunes of vivid pink-to-orange color, an indication of a high concentration of iron in the sand and consequent oxidation processes. The oldest dunes are those of a more intense reddish color. These dunes are among the highest in the world; many of them are above 200 metres, the highest being the one nicknamed Big Daddy, about 325 metres high, however the highest dune in the Namib Desert, Dune 7, is about 388 metres high.

The highest and more stable dunes are partially covered with a relatively rich vegetation, which is mainly watered by a number of underground and ephemeral rivers that seasonally flood the pans, creating marshes that are locally known as vlei; when dry, these pans look almost white in color, due to the high concentration of salt. Another relevant source of water for Sossusvlei is the humidity brought by the daily morning fogs that enter the desert from the Atlantic Ocean.

Fauna in the Sossusvlei area is relatively rich. It mostly comprises small animals that can survive with little water, including a number of arthropods, small reptiles and small mammalians such as rodents or jackals); bigger animals include antelopes (mainly oryxes and springboks) and ostriches. During the flood season, several migrant bird species appear along the marshes and rivers. Much of the Sossusvlei and Namib fauna is endemic and highly adapted to the specific features of the Namib. Most notably, fog beetles such as the Namib Desert Beetle have developed a technique for collecting water from early morning fogs through the bumps in their back.

Climate 

The Etosha National Park has a savanna desert climate. The annual mean average temperature is 24 °C. In winter, the mean nighttime lows  are around 10 °C, while in summer temperatures often hover around 40 °C. As it is a desert, there is a large variation between day and night. Rain almost never falls in the winter.

Landmarks

Sesriem

Access to the Sossusvlei area of the Namib-Naukluft National Park is from the Sesriem gate, which is located in the surroundings of the eponymous canyon. From Sesriem, a 60 km tarmac road leads to Sossusvlei proper.

Elim Dune
The Elim Dune is a high and relatively isolated dune located 5 km past the Sesriem gate, on a branch of the main road connecting Sesriem to Sossusvlei. The dune takes its name from a farm that used to be in the area before the National Park was established.

Dune 45

Dune 45 is so called because it lies 45 km past Sesriem on the road to Sossusvlei. It is 80 meters high and it is composed of 5-million-year-old sands.

Sossusvlei

Sossusvlei is about 66 km past the Sesriem gate.  The last 6 km can only be traversed with 4WD vehicles as the metalled road ends and sand begins (the place where the metalled road ends is known as "2x4 parking" as any non-4WD vehicle must stop there). Sossusvlei is a clay pan, of roughly elliptical shape, covered in a crust of salt-rich sand. While the pan has been shaped over time by the Tsauchab river, the actual flooding of the pan is a relatively rare event, and sometimes several years pass between one flood and the next one. The river is dry most of the year, and even when it is not, it carries relatively little water to the vlei. The vlei is surrounded by high orange-reddish dunes, partially covered by a vegetation comprising grass, bushes, and some tree (mostly of species Vachellia erioloba).

Big Daddy
Big Daddy is the highest dune in the Sossusvlei area, at about 325 meters. Big Daddy is located past Sossusvlei proper, near Deadvlei. It faces another very high dune known as "Big Mama".

Big Daddy is distinct from Dune 7, near Walvis Bay.

Deadvlei

Deadvlei is another clay pan, about 2 km from Sossusvlei. A notable feature of Deadvlei is that it used to be an oasis with several camelthorn trees; afterwards, the river that watered the oasis changed its course. The pan is thus punctuated by blackened, dead camelthorn trees, in vivid contrast to the shiny white of the salty floor of the pan and the intense orange of the dunes. This creates a particularly fascinating and surrealistic landscape, that appears in innumerable pictures and has been used as a setting for films and videos.

Hiddenvlei
Hiddenvlei (or Hidden Vlei) is another vlei in the Sossusvlei area. It is 4 km from the 2×4 parking, and it is the least visited.

Petrified dunes
Petrified dunes are sand dunes that have solidified to rock and are found in several places in the Sossusvlei area.

Tourism

Since Sossusvlei is possibly the foremost attraction of Namibia, much has been done by the Namibian authorities to support and facilitate tourism in the area. The asphalt road was built in the early 2000s (decade) to connect Sesriem and Sossusvlei's 2x4 parking is one of the very few non-urban metalled roads in Namibia. Numerous places of accommodation are found along the border of the National Park, between Sesriem and the nearest settlement, Solitaire. Recently, accommodation has been built inside the park. It is also possible to take scenic flights over the dunes, either with small planes (mainly from Swakopmund and Walvis Bay) or in hot air balloons (departing from Sesriem in the morning).

In popular culture
As a consequence of its fascinating and surrealistic landscapes, Sossusvlei is one of the most photographed places in Subsaharan Africa. The area has been the setting of a number of commercials, music videos, and movies, especially of the fantasy genre; one of the most well-known examples is the psychological thriller The Cell (2000), where the Sossusvlei landscape is used to represent an oneiric virtual reality.

The nonverbal documentary "Samsara" depends on a number of shots of the desert for subtle spiritual commentary. Other movies with scenes shot in Sossusvlei include "The Fall" and "Steel Dawn''".

Notes

References

External links

 
 Sossusvlei attractions
 Tsauchab River and Sossus Vlei Lakebed, Namibia at the NASA Earth Observatory website
 Images from Sossusvlei
 Photos of Spectacular Namib Desert Sand Dunes in Sossusvlei, Namibia
 Map of Sossusvlei
 Visiting Sossusvlei
 Picture Gallery of Sossusvlei

Salt pans of Namibia
Dunes of Namibia
Namib-Naukluft National Park